Marijan Antolović (born 7 May 1989) is a Croatian professional football goalkeeper who plays for Cibalia   in the Druga HNL.

Career
During the 2009–10 season, Antolović was chosen as part of "the best team / the best 11" ("ideal team") of the first round of 2009–10 season by sports journalists from Index.hr.

The 2009–10 season has seen Antolović achieve more success when he set a historical record in the Croatian First by not conceding a goal in 551 minutes of play. Head coach of Croatian 'A' national team Slaven Bilić informed the Croatian press that he is counting on Antolović in future to become goalkeeper of the Croatia national football team.

Personal life

On 27 November 2014, Antolović received Bosnian citizenship. His family is from Bosnia and Herzegovina; his father is from Žepče and his mother is from Vitez. Antolović is student at the Faculty of Business within the University of Osijek.

Honours

Player

Club
Legia Warsaw
Polish Cup: 2010–11

Željezničar Sarajevo
Bosnian Premier League: 2012–13

Glentoran
Irish Cup: 2019-20

References

External links
 
 
 Article into Croatian press that Croatian Champion NK Dinamo Zagreb is interested in Marijan Antolovic for Transfer Window 2010 
 Article into Croatian in Vecernji list that Marijan Antolovic was "the best player of the match" Dinamo Zagreb - Cibalia 1-1 on 25 October 2009 

1989 births
Living people
Sportspeople from Vinkovci
Naturalized citizens of Bosnia and Herzegovina
Association football goalkeepers
Croatian footballers
Croatia youth international footballers
Croatia under-21 international footballers
HNK Cibalia players
Legia Warsaw players
FK Borac Banja Luka players
FK Željezničar Sarajevo players
Hapoel Haifa F.C. players
FC Koper players
NK Osijek players
Glentoran F.C. players
Croatian Football League players
Ekstraklasa players
Premier League of Bosnia and Herzegovina players
Israeli Premier League players
Slovenian PrvaLiga players
NIFL Premiership players
Croatian expatriate footballers
Expatriate footballers in Poland
Croatian expatriate sportspeople in Poland
Expatriate footballers in Bosnia and Herzegovina
Croatian expatriate sportspeople in Bosnia and Herzegovina
Expatriate footballers in Israel
Croatian expatriate sportspeople in Israel
Expatriate footballers in Slovenia
Croatian expatriate sportspeople in Slovenia
Expatriate association footballers in Northern Ireland
Croatian expatriate sportspeople in Northern Ireland
University of Osijek alumni